American entertainer Janet Jackson began her career through a series of acting roles, prior to releasing her self-titled debut album at the age of fifteen. She has sold over 100 million records.

Jackson has received eleven American Music Awards, five Grammy Awards, ten MTV Video Music Awards, and 11 Billboard Music Awards. Her most notable accolades include the American Music Award's "Award of Merit," Billboard Award's "Artistic Achievement Award," MTV's "Video Vanguard Award," and Recording Academy's "Governor's Award," in addition to MTV's inaugural Icon tribute, and Radio Music Award's "Legend and World Music Awards' "Legend Award". Jackson holds several world records, and ranks as the most-searched person in internet history. She has received Academy Award and Golden Globe nominations for her musical contributions within film, while her humanitarian efforts have garnered APLA's "Commitment to Life Award," amfAR's "Award of Courage," and GLAAD's "Vanguard Award."

Academy Awards

A Place Called Home Organization

AIDS Project Los Angeles
The AIDS Project Los Angeles (APLA) is a non-profit organization dedicated to improving the lives of people affected by the HIV disease, reducing HIV infection, and advocating for fair and effective usage of HIV-related public policy. Janet received the Commitment to Life Award for her contributions to the organization.

A&M Records

American Choreography Awards

American Cinema Awards

American Music Awards
The American Music Awards are an annual awards ceremony, created by Dick Clark. Janet holds the record for the most nominations from one album, with thirteen nominations for Control. Janet won eleven awards (including the Award of Merit).

AmfAR Cinema Against AIDS Gala

AOL Television Awards

ASCAP's Pop Music Awards

!
|-
! scope="row"|1994
|"That's the Way Love Goes"
|Most Performed Song
|
|style="text-align:center;" | 
|}

ASCAP's Rhythm and Soul Awards

!
|-
! scope="row"|2002
|"All for You"
|Top Dance Song
|
|style="text-align:center;" | 
|}

Behind the Bench Awards

!
|-
! scope="row"|2004
|Herself
|Touching a Life Award
|
|style="text-align:center;" | 
|}

BET Awards

BET J Virtual Awards

Billboard Magazine Year-End Number One Awards
The Billboard Magazine Year-End Number-One Awards were sponsored by Billboard magazine to honor artists based on Billboard Year-End Charts during the 1980s.

Billboard Music Awards
According to Billboard, she has won 11 awards.

Billboard/Tanqueray Sterling Music Video Awards

Black Gold Awards

Black Reel Awards

Black Girls Rock! Awards
Janet received the Rock Star award at the 2018 Black Girls Rock! ceremony on August 26, 2018.

Blockbuster Entertainment Awards
The Blockbuster Entertainment Awards were an annual awards ceremony honoring the best in music, film, and video games. Janet received four awards from the event, including "Favorite Female Singer."

BMI Awards

BMI Pop Awards

BMI R&B/Hip-Hop Awards

Bravo Otto Awards (Germany)
The Bravo Otto Awards were established by Bravo, the largest teen magazine within the German-language sphere. It honored the top performers in film, music, television, and sports. Janet has received multiple awards in the "Female Singer" category.

BRIT Awards (UK)
The Brit Awards, also known as The BRITs, are the British Phonographic Industry's annual pop music awards. Janet has received multiple nominations, including "Best International Female Artist."

British LGBT Awards

!Ref.
|-
| 2020
| Janet Jackson
| Celebrity Ally
| 
|

CableACE Awards

Capital Gold Awards (UK)

Channel V Awards (Australia)

Clio Awards

C.O.R.E

Dance Gallery Award

Diamond Awards Festival (Belgium)

DMC World DJ Championships

ECHO Awards (Germany)
The ECHO Awards are an annual German music awards ceremony, granted by the Deutsche Phono-Akademie. It is the successor to the Deutscher Schallplattenpreis.

Edison Awards (Netherlands)

Ebony awards

American Black Achievement Awards

Pre-Oscar Celebration Honors

Essence Awards

FHM Magazine

GAFFA Awards

Denmark GAFFA Awards
Delivered since 1991, the GAFFA Awards are a Danish award that rewards popular music by the magazine of the same name.

!
|-
| 1997
| Herself
| Best Foreign Female Act
| 
| style="text-align:center;" |
|-
|}

GLAAD Media Awards
The GLAAD Media Awards were established by the Gay & Lesbian Alliance Against Defamation (GLAAD) to honor various entertainers and media organizations for their outstanding contributions regarding issues within the LGBT community. Janet was presented the Vanguard Award by Ellen DeGeneres for her significant difference in promoting equal rights for gay, lesbian, and transgender people.

Golden Globe Awards

Greater Harlem Chamber of Commerce

Guinness Book of British Hit Singles

Guinness Book of World Records
The Guinness Book of World Records is a reference book published annually. It compiles a list of world records, including human achievements and extremes of the natural world. She has nine inclusions in the Guinness Book of World Records.

Grammy Awards
The Grammy Awards, or Grammys, are presented annually by the National Academy of Recording Arts and Sciences. The ceremony honors outstanding achievements in the music industry, with awards of the most popular interest presented during the live televised event.

Janet has Grammy Award nominations spanning five different genres (Pop, Rock, Dance, Rap and R&B). During the 32nd Annual Grammy Awards, she became the first female artist to be nominated for Producer of the Year, following her production contributions on her fourth album, Rhythm Nation 1814.

Harlem Fashion Row Style Awards

Hit Awards (Norway)

Hollywood Walk of Fame
The Hollywood Walk of Fame is a group of stars embedded in the sidewalk along Hollywood Boulevard and Vine Street in Hollywood, California. The stars are permanent public monuments for public figures in the entertainment industry.

Human Rights Campaign

HX Awards

Image Awards
The Image Awards are presented annually by the National Association for the Advancement of Colored People to honor outstanding contributions within film, television, music, and literature. She has received multiple accolades from the ceremony, including the "Chairman's Award" and "Outstanding Supporting Actress in a Motion Picture" for her performance in Why Did I Get Married?.

International Dance Music Awards
The International Dance Music Awards, held during the Winter Music Conference, is an annual electronic music ceremony. It honors the highest achievements by artists within the dance music genre. Janet has received multiple accolades from the event, including an award for "Outstanding Achievement in Dance Music".

Japan Gold Disc Awards

Japan Radio Popular Disks Awards

Lady of Soul Awards

Lisa Lopes Foundation

LOGO's NewNowNext Awards

Metropolitan Transportation Authority
Jackson was honored by New York City's Metropolitan Transportation Authority as part of Harlem Week 2018's “Women Transforming Our World: Past, Present and Future.”

Mnet Asian Music Awards

MOBO Awards (UK)

MTV Europe Music Awards
The MTV Europe Music Awards, also referred to as the EMAs, were established to honor the most popular music videos in Europe. Janet has received eight nominations, winning for "Best Female" and "Global Icon".

MTV Icon
MTV Icon was an annual ceremony which recognized an artist who made significant contributions within music, music video, and popular culture, while impacting the MTV generation. Janet was selected to receive the network's inaugural Icon tribute, and was the only pop artist chosen to receive the honor.

MTV Japan Video Music Awards
Janet received the "Inspiration Award" for her influence within music video and popular culture at the event's third annual ceremony.

MTV Movie Awards
The MTV Movie Awards are an annual MTV Awards ceremony honoring the best in film. Nominees are determined by a panel at Tenth Planet Productions, while the winners are decided by the general public. Janet won two awards for her film debut in Poetic Justice.

MTV Video Music Awards
The MTV Video Music Awards were established by MTV to celebrate the top music videos of the year. Janet received the Video Vanguard Award, the ceremony's highest honor, and has been nominated for Video of the Year multiple times. "Scream" is the most nominated video in the show's history.

Music & Media (Europe)

MVPA Awards
On May 12, 2005, the MVPA held their 14th annual MVPA awards. Jackson and director Francis Lawrence received an award for Director of the Year.

Los Angeles Chapter of the Recording Academy
The National Academy of Recording Arts & Sciences, also known as the Recording Academy, is an organization of recording professionals, including musicians, producers, and sound engineers. During its 2002 Membership Awards, Janet was awarded a special award of merit; the Recording Academy's Governor's Award.

Nancy Susan Reynolds Award (Center For Population Options)

National Association of Black Owned Broadcasters Awards

National Association of Recording Merchandisers 
The National Association of Recording Merchandisers is a not-for-profit trade Award which serves music retailing businesses. Janet has received four accolades from the NARM Awards, including "Best-Selling Recording of the Year" for her fifth album, janet.

Nickelodeon Kids' Choice Awards

Nielsen Broadcast Data System Awards

NRJ Awards (France)

One Hundred Black Men Honors

OUT Magazine

Pandora Internet Radio Awards
To kick off African-American Music Appreciation Month, Pandora Radio honored Jackson with an award for receiving over 1 billion streams on Pandora.

People's Choice Awards
The People's Choice Awards recognizes particular figures within popular culture. The annual ceremony is described to be determined by the opinion of the general public. Janet has received several nominations, including "Favorite All-Around Female Entertainer".

People Magazine Awards

Radio Disney Music Awards
Janet received the inaugural impact award at the 2018 Radio Disney Music Awards ceremony on June 22, 2018.

Radio Music Awards
Janet received the "Legend Award" at the Radio Music Awards' fifth annual ceremony.
|-

Rock and Roll Hall of Fame

The Rock and Roll Hall of Fame is a museum located on the shores of Lake Erie in downtown Cleveland, Ohio, United States, dedicated to recording the history of some of the best-known and most influential artists, producers, and other people who have in some major way influenced the music industry.

Janet Jackson was inducted into the Rock and Roll Hall of Fame on March 29, 2019.

Silver Horn Film & TV Awards

Starlight Foundation Awards

Soul Train Music Awards
The Soul Train Music Awards are an annual ceremony which honor the best in Black music and entertainment. It is produced by the makers of Soul Train, the program from which it takes its name. Janet has the second most wins of any artist in the ceremony's history.

Spelman College Sisters Award

The Carnival: Choreographer's Ball

The Source Music Awards

TEC Awards

Teen Choice Awards

Telly Awards

TMF Awards (Netherlands)

TV Land Awards

TVZ Video Awards (Brazil)

Urban Teen Music Awards (USA)

VH1 awards

VH1 Big in '04 Awards

VH1/Vogue Fashion Awards

VH1 Video Music Awards

VH1 My Music Awards

Vibe Magazine Awards

World Music Awards

World Music Video Awards

ZAZ Awards (South Africa)

References

External links 
Janet Jackson: Awards on the Internet Movie Database

Awards
Jackson, Janet